Etchison may refer to:

Etchison, Maryland, U.S.

People with the surname
Buck Etchison (1915–1980), American baseball player
Dennis Etchison (born 1943), American writer